George Klein (born May 15, 1932, date of death not found) was a Canadian football player who played for the BC Lions and Montreal Alouettes. He previously played football at McGill University.

References

1932 births
Year of death missing
Canadian football running backs
McGill Redbirds football players
BC Lions players
Montreal Alouettes players